Allison Lynn Reed (born June 8, 1994) is an American-born ice dancer who currently competes for Lithuania with Saulius Ambrulevičius. She previously skated with Otar Japaridze for Georgia and with Vasili Rogov for Israel. With Japaridze, she competed at the 2010 Winter Olympics.

Biography 
Allison Reed was born in Kalamazoo, Michigan to a Japanese mother and an American father. She is the younger sister of Japanese ice dancers Cathy and Chris Reed. She grew up in Warren Township, New Jersey and attended Warren Middle School and Watchung Hills Regional High School. She received a Georgian passport in January 2010.

Skating career 
Reed started skating at the age of three. Originally a singles skater, she teamed up with her first ice dancing partner, Georgia's Otar Japaridze, in May 2009. They trained in Mount Laurel, New Jersey with coach and choreographer Evgeni Platov. They qualified an entry for Georgia at the 2010 Winter Olympics at the 2009 Nebelhorn Trophy. Reed and Japaridze split following the 2010–2011 season.

In 2012, Reed teamed up with Vasili Rogov to compete for Israel. They withdrew from the 2013 European Championships after Rogov fell ill. They competed at the 2013 World Championships and finished 23rd. They dropped down to 30th at the 2014 World Championships but moved up to 20th at the 2015 World Championships in Shanghai, advancing to the Free Skate for the first time at the World Championships. Reed and Vogov announced the end of their partnership on June 24, 2015.

Reed teamed up with Lithuania's Saulius Ambrulevičius in spring 2017. They made their competitive debut at the 2017 CS Ondrej Nepela Trophy in September. By placing fifteenth at the 2021 World Championships in Stockholm, Reed/Ambrulevičius qualified for a place for a Lithuanian dance team at the 2022 Winter Olympics. However, Reed's application for Lithuanian citizenship was denied, thus ending their bid for the Winter Olympics.

Programs

With Ambrulevičius

With Rogov

With Japaridze

Results 
GP: Grand Prix; CS: Challenger Series; JGP: Junior Grand Prix

With Ambrulevičius for Lithuania

With Rogov for Israel

With Japaridze for Georgia

References

External links 

 
 
 

1994 births
Living people
American female ice dancers
Lithuanian female ice dancers
Israeli female ice dancers
Female ice dancers from Georgia (country)
Sportspeople from Kalamazoo, Michigan
Figure skaters at the 2010 Winter Olympics
Olympic figure skaters of Georgia (country)
American sportspeople of Japanese descent
People from Warren Township, New Jersey
Sportspeople from Somerset County, New Jersey
Watchung Hills Regional High School alumni
21st-century American women